Shangda Road is a metro station on Line 7 of the Shanghai Metro in Baoshan District, Shanghai. It began operation on December 5, 2009.

The station has 3 platforms, but only the outer island platform and the side platform are in regular service.

Nearby
Shanghai University, Baoshan Campus

Railway stations in Shanghai
Shanghai Metro stations in Baoshan District
Railway stations in China opened in 2009
Line 7, Shanghai Metro